Leonardo Lima da Silva  (born 14 January 1982) is a Brazilian professional footballer who plays as an attacking midfielder for Madureira. He has played for teams such as Vasco da Gama, CSKA Sofia, Marítimo, Porto, Flamengo and Al-Nasr (Dubai).

External links
 CBF
 sambafoot
 zerozero.pt
 Guardian Stats Centre
 terceiroanel
 globoesporte
 globoesporte

Living people
1982 births
Footballers from Rio de Janeiro (city)
Brazilian footballers
Brazil youth international footballers
Brazil under-20 international footballers
Brazil international footballers
Brazilian expatriate footballers
Campeonato Brasileiro Série A players
Madureira Esporte Clube players
CR Vasco da Gama players
PFC CSKA Sofia players
C.S. Marítimo players
FC Porto players
Al-Nasr SC (Dubai) players
Sharjah FC players
Santos FC players
Grêmio Foot-Ball Porto Alegrense players
CR Flamengo footballers
Sociedade Esportiva Palmeiras players
Primeira Liga players
First Professional Football League (Bulgaria) players
Expatriate footballers in Bulgaria
Expatriate footballers in Portugal
Expatriate footballers in the United Arab Emirates
Goiás Esporte Clube players
São Paulo FC players
Brazilian expatriate sportspeople in Bulgaria
Brazilian expatriate sportspeople in the United Arab Emirates
Association football midfielders
UAE Pro League players